Belknap is an unincorporated community in Perry Township, Vanderburgh County, in the U.S. state of Indiana.

History
The community was likely named after William W. Belknap, a politician and former United States Secretary of War.

Geography

References

Unincorporated communities in Vanderburgh County, Indiana
Unincorporated communities in Indiana